Gannon is a surname. Notable people with the surname include:

Bob Gannon (1959–2017), American businessman and politician
Craig Gannon (born 1966), English guitarist
Jeff Gannon (born 1957), pen name of James Guckert, a former White House reporter
Jim Gannon (born 1968), English football manager
Jim Gannon (rugby league) (born 1977), Australian professional rugby league player
John D. Gannon (1948–1999, computer scientist, professor at the University of Maryland
John Mark Gannon (1877–1968), former archbishop of the Diocese of Erie
Jonathan Gannon, National Football League Coach
Kelli Gannon (born 1978), former field hockey midfield player from the United States
Kim Gannon (1900–1974), American songwriter
Mary Gannon (1829—1868), American actress
Mary Gannon (born 1868), co-founder of the architectural firm Gannon and Hands
Rich Gannon (born 1965), National Football League quarterback
Tim Gannon (born 1948), polo player, co-founder of Outback Steakhouse
Terry Gannon (born 1963), sportscaster for ESPN on ABC and ESPN
Tom Gannon (1943–2021), American politician

See also
Gannon University, university in Erie, Pennsylvania
An early romanization/spelling error of Ganon, villain from Nintendo's video game series franchise The Legend of Zelda